Events in the year 1986 in Bulgaria.

Incumbents 

 General Secretaries of the Bulgarian Communist Party: Todor Zhivkov
 Chairmen of the Council of Ministers: Grisha Filipov (from 1981 until March 21) Georgi Atanasov (from March 21 until 1990)

Events 

 June 8 – Parliamentary elections were held in Bulgaria.

References 

 
1980s in Bulgaria
Years of the 20th century in Bulgaria
Bulgaria
Bulgaria